Geoffrey Hoyle (born 12 January 1941) is an English science fiction writer, best known for the works which he co-wrote with his father, the astronomer Sir Fred Hoyle. About half of Fred Hoyle's science fiction works were co-written with his son.

He was educated at Bryanston School in Dorset, and then entered Cambridge where he read Economics. After 1964, Hoyle worked in London in the field of modern communications and the film/television industry. Unlike his father, he is not a scientist, and contributed to the more "human" side of their novels – however, he did work as a "scientific advisor" to some series such as Timeslip.

In 2010, his book 2010: Living in the Future was popularised by a blog which compared Hoyle's 38-year-old predictions with the reality of modern life. This led to a Facebook campaign to track down Hoyle and talk to him about his visions.

Works
(Novels unless otherwise specified)

With his father, Fred Hoyle:
 Fifth Planet, 1963
 Rockets in Ursa Major, 1969 (based on a play by Fred)
 Seven Steps to the Sun, 1970
 The Inferno, 1973 
 The Molecule Men and the Monster of Loch Ness, 1973 (short story collection)
 Into Deepest Space, 1974 
 The Incandescent Ones, 1977 
 The Westminster Disaster, 1978  
 Commonsense in Nuclear Energy, 1980 (non-fiction)
 The Professor Gamma series 
 The Energy Pirate, 1982 
 The Frozen Planet of Azuron, 1982 
 The Giants of Universal Park, 1982 
 The Planet of Death, 1982

With Janice Robertson
 Ask Me Why, 1976 (non-fiction)

As sole author -
 2010: Living in the Future, 1972 (illustrated by Alasdair Anderson)
 Disaster, 1975
 Flight (Achievements), 1984 (illustrated by Gerald Witcomb)

References

 Fifth Planet'' cover notes
 Fantastic Fiction entry
 Sci Fan bibliography

External links
 Books with son Geoffrey

 2010: Living in the future: the book

1942 births
Living people
People educated at Bryanston School
English science fiction writers
Alumni of the University of Cambridge
English male novelists